Prince Leopold of Bavaria (Leopold Maximilian Joseph Maria Arnulf; 9 February 1846 – 28 September 1930) was born in Munich, the son of Prince Regent Luitpold of Bavaria (1821–1912) and his wife Archduchess Augusta of Austria (1825–1864). He was a Field Marshal (Generalfeldmarschall) who commanded German and Austro-Hungarian forces on the Eastern Front in World War I.

Biography

Military career 
Prince Leopold entered the Bavarian Army at the age of 15, and received his patent as a lieutenant dated 28 November 1861.  He saw first combat during the Austro-Prussian War in 1866, where he commanded an artillery battery at Kissingen and Rossbrunn.

In 1870, King Ludwig II of Bavaria sent Leopold to the battlefields of France, where the Bavarian Army was fighting alongside the Prussian Army in the Franco-Prussian War.  He served with the 3rd Bavarian Artillery Regiment and saw action at Sedan and Beauvert. He was promoted to major in December 1870. For his bravery against the enemy he received both the Iron Cross 1st and 2nd Classes, the Bavarian Military Merit Order Knight 1st Class, the Knight's Cross of the Military Order of Max Joseph, Bavaria's highest military decoration, and decorations from several other German states.

In the post-war years, Prince Leopold spent most of his time travelling, visiting Africa, Asia and countries of Europe.  He was married on 20 April 1873 at Vienna to his second cousin Archduchess Gisela of Austria, daughter of Emperor Franz Joseph of Austria and the Empress Elisabeth. From 1881 to 1887 Leopold was the commander of the 1st Royal Bavarian Division, from 1887 to 1892 of the I Royal Bavarian Corps. In both commands he would be succeeded by his younger brother, Prince Arnulf of Bavaria. In 1892 Leopold became the inspector general of the 4th Army Inspection, replacing Leonhard Graf von Blumenthal. After his appointment, the 4th Army Inspection gradually became consistent of Bavarian corps. He remained in the Bavarian Army and was finally promoted to the rank of field marshal (Generalfeldmarschall) on 1 January 1905. In 1911 he ordered a 6m racing yacht "Ralle II" from the great British yacht designer Alfred Mylne, built at the Rambeck yard on Lake Starnberg. He retired from active duty in 1913 to give chances to Rupprecht, Crown Prince of Bavaria.

First World War 
Prince Leopold's retirement, however, did not last long. On 16 April 1915, he was given command of the German 9th Army, replacing General August von Mackensen. Leopold quickly proved himself an able commander as he took Warsaw on 4 August 1915. Following this success, he was put in command of Army Group Prince Leopold of Bavaria (Heeresgruppe Prinz Leopold von Bayern), which was a German force in the central/northern sector of the Eastern Front.  He was awarded the Grand Cross of the Military Order of Max Joseph on 5 August 1915, the prestigious Pour le Mérite, Prussia's highest military decoration, on 9 August 1915 and the oak leaves to the Pour le Mérite on 25 July 1917.

On 29 August 1916, after the brutal summer campaigns succeeded in reversing the Brusilov Offensive against the Austrians, Leopold became the Supreme Commander of the German forces on the Eastern front (Oberbefehlshaber Ost), succeeding Field Marshal Paul von Hindenburg. Leopold held this post for the rest of the war. Because of his position, Leopold was a potential German candidate for the throne of the puppet Kingdom of Poland.

On 4 March 1918, Leopold received yet another high honor, the Grand Cross of the Iron Cross, awarded only five times during World War I.

Prince Leopold retired again in 1918 after the signing of the Treaty of Brest-Litovsk, which had ended the war on the Eastern Front. This treaty was highly favorable to Germany, and Leopold ended his career with success. He died on 28 September 1930 in Munich and is buried in the Colombarium in the Michaelskirche in Munich.

Military ranks
Sekondlieutenant:  28 November 1861
Premierlieutenant:  5 June 1864
Hauptmann:  28 April 1867
Major:  11 December 1870
Oberstleutnant:  27 March 1871
Oberst:  18 February 1873
Generalmajor:  1 November 1875
Generalleutnant:  16 June 1881
General der Kavallerie:  2 March 1887
Generaloberst:  9 February 1896
Generalfeldmarschall:  1 January 1905

Family
Prince Leopold and his wife Gisela had four children:
 Princess Elisabeth Marie of Bavaria (1874–1957), who married Otto Ludwig Philipp Graf von Seefried auf Buttenheim
 Princess Auguste Maria of Bavaria (1875–1964), who married Archduke Joseph August of Austria
 Prince Georg of Bavaria (1880–1943), married Archduchess Isabella of Austria
 Prince Konrad of Bavaria (1883–1969), who married Princess Bona Margherita of Savoy-Genoa

Decorations and honors
German decorations

Other countries

The orders above which were from Allied nations were awarded prior to World War I.

Ancestry

Notes

Further reading

Leopold Prinz von Bayern 1846-1930: aus den Lebenserinnerungen, edited by Hans-Michael Körner and Ingrid Körner. Regensburg: F. Pustet, 1983.
Wolbe, Eugen. Generalfeldmarschall Prinz Leopold von Bayern: ein Lebensbild. Leipzig: R.F. Koehler, 1920.

External links
 

1846 births
1930 deaths
People of the Austro-Prussian War
German military personnel of the Franco-Prussian War
German Army generals of World War I
Field marshals of Bavaria
Field marshals of the German Empire
Princes of Bavaria
House of Wittelsbach
Members of the Bavarian Reichsrat
People from the Kingdom of Bavaria
Treaty of Brest-Litovsk negotiators
Recipients of the Iron Cross (1870)
Recipients of the Iron Cross (1914), 1st class
Recipients of the Grand Cross of the Iron Cross
Recipients of the Pour le Mérite (military class)
Knights of the Golden Fleece of Austria
Grand Crosses of the Military Order of Maria Theresa
Grand Crosses of the Order of Saint Stephen of Hungary
Grand Crosses of the Military Order of Max Joseph
Recipients of the Gold Imtiyaz Medal
Grand Crosses of the Order of the Star of Romania
Recipients of the Order of the Cross of Takovo
Recipients of the Military Merit Cross (Mecklenburg-Schwerin), 1st class
Annulled Honorary Knights Grand Cross of the Royal Victorian Order
Grand Crosses of the Military Merit Order (Bavaria)
Recipients of the Military Merit Cross (Mecklenburg-Schwerin)
Recipients of the Hanseatic Cross (Bremen)
Recipients of the Hanseatic Cross (Lübeck)
Burials at St. Michael's Church, Munich
Military personnel from Munich